Aşıq Pəri (ca. 1811-ca. 1847), also known as Ashiq Peri or Ashig Pari, was an Azerbaijani poet and folk singer. She is remembered as one of the pioneering women to participate in the tradition of Ashik and for her skill of composition.

Early life
Adolf Bergé, an Orientalist who traveled throughout The Caucasus, first described Aşıq Pəri as he encountered her in 1829. He noted an 18-year-old girl poet which he discovered in Maralyan on the banks of the Aras River and identified her as Ashiq Pari. An Ashik or Aşıq is a lyric poet who composes and sings the oral traditions of a region, similar to the western custom of bards or troubadours. Pəri is the Azerbaijani word for faery and thus the name is a pen name, leaving the poets' origins and real name obscured. It is generally assumed based on Bergé's account that she was born between 1811 and 1813 in the Maralyan village of Jabrayil. Her father, Haji Sajad, was a merchant who peddled goods and her mother, Gulustan, taught her daughter Arabic-Persian traditions. Pəri was very gifted in singing and spinning fairy tales in a free spirited free flow of poetry.

Career
Pəri moved to Shusha, the capital of the Karabakh Khanate around 1830. She traveled throughout Karabakh and became noted for her talent and skill in composition. From the middle of the nineteenth century, literary critics praised her work and cited her lyric poems as significant examples of the genre. In 1856, Mirza Yousif Nersesov (also known as Mirza Yusif Garabaghi) published an anthology, Məcmueyi-Vaqif və müasirani-digər, one of the first works to print and discuss her poems. Bergé, published his information about her the magazine Məcmueyi-əşari-şüəarayi-Azərbaycan in Leipzig in 1867. The literary scholar Firidun bey Kocharli, praised her work in 1903 and wrote of the attention she created among the literary elite of her time. Contemporaries of Kocharli and Pəri, such as Mohammad bey Ashiq, Jafargulu agha Javanshir and Assad Bey dedicated poems to her.

Death and legacy
Pəri's death is variously reported as having occurred in 1847 or 1848 in Shusha. She is remembered as the first woman to compose in the Ashik tradition and for the wisdom, lyric beauty and skill portrayed in her works.

References

Citations

Bibliography

1811 births
1847 deaths
Azerbaijani-language poets
19th-century women writers